Šuput is a Serbian surname. It may refer to:

Bogdan Šuput (born 1914-1942), Serbian painter
Maja Šuput (born 1979), Croatian singer
Miroslav Šuput (born 1948), Slovene painter and illustrator
Predrag Šuput (born 1977), Serbian basketball player

Serbian surnames
Croatian surnames